Mahasamund railway station is the principal station of Mahasamund, Chhattisgarh, India. It is an important station of the Sambalpur railway division of the East Coast Railway zone.

Facilities

Mahasamund station is a model station declared in the Railway Budget. It has a computerised reservation counter, parking, a canteen, a cloak room, a waiting hall, a goods shed, and an automatic announcer. An R.P.F. police station is also located in the station. Mahasamund falls under East Coast Railway zone Sambalpur railway division so this city lacks some standard facilities.

Dualling of the railway track from Raipur, Mahasamund to Titlagarh is in progress and may be completed in October 2019. The Mahasamund–Arand section is complete. Two new platforms have been sanctioned and construction started. Now Railway Board is decided to  generate new additional Divisional Railway Manager post in Mahasamund.

List of major trains

 Lokmnanya Tilak Terminus–Puri Superfast Express (via Sambalpur)
 Gandhidham–Puri Weekly Express (via Vizianagaram)
 Gandhidham–Puri Weekly Superfast Express (via Sambalpur)
 Puri–Ahmedabad Express (via Vizianagaram) 
 Puri–Ahmedabad Weekly Express (via Sambalpur) 
 Puri–Durg Express
 Puri–Sainagar Shirdi Express
 Puri–Ajmer Express
 Samata Express
 Visakhapatnam–Bhagat Ki Kothi Express
 Visakhapatnam–Lokmanya Tilak Terminus Superfast Express
 Korba–Visakhapatnam Express
 Bilaspur–Tirupati Express
 Durg–Jagdalpur Express
 Junagarh Road–Raipur Passenger
 Titlagarh–Raipur Passenger
 Raipur–Visakhapatnam Passenger
 Durg–Visakhapatnam Passenger

Nearby attractions
 Sirpur 
 Barnawapara Wildlife Sanctuary 
 Rajim  
 Sanjay Kanan Picnic Spot

References 

Railway stations in Mahasamund district
Sambalpur railway division